Reform Jersey is a social-democratic political party in Jersey, a British Crown Dependency in the Channel Islands.

History

Formation 
Reform Jersey was founded in 2012 as a pressure group by Montfort Tadier, Nick Le Cornu, Jason Cronin and Sam Mézec. On 24 April 2014, Deputies Mézec and Le Cornu announced that it would become a party to contest the 2014 general election scheduled for October. It was legally registered as a political party at the Royal Court on 4 July 2014. Reform Jersey founding member Deputy Nick Le Cornu was expelled from the party in September 2014 for posting an offensive Tweet about another politician.

Candidates 
For the 2014 general election on 15 October 2014, Reform Jersey put up eight candidates. Deputies Sam Mézec, Montfort Tadier and Geoff Southern were re-elected but none of the new Reform candidates were successful.

In the 2018 general election on 16 May 2018, the party returned four deputies (including new Deputies Robert Ward and Carina Alves), with Mézec gaining a senatorial seat. On the 3rd of July 2018, Mézec was appointed first Minister of Children and Housing. After nearly only two and half years in the role, on the 8th of November 2020 Mézec resigned from his role as the Minister of Children and Housing in support of a vote of no confidence against the Chief Minister, and subsequently the party organised into a parliamentary 'Opposition' block and allocated their members policy portfolios.

In the 2022 general election the party won 10 seats, doubling the seat count of its prior highest electoral performance and becoming the largest political party in the States Assembly.

Ideology and platform
The party states its support for a living wage, progressive taxation, 26 weeks' statutory maternity leave, construction of affordable housing, and democratic reform of the States of Jersey and the parish system. Their 2018 campaign, included the message, ‘improving the standard of living’.

Reform Jersey supported and campaigned for the legalisation of same-sex marriage and organised a rally in support of equal marriage on 12 July 2014, prior to the legalisation of same-sex marriage in Jersey on 1 July 2018.

The party's 2018 election manifesto, Working For A Fairer Island, promised tax reform, grants to cover the cost of university tuition fees, a rent freeze on the social housing sector, an empty property tax, and electoral reform of the States of Jersey to introduce one type of States member elected in equal-size constituencies. It also expressed support for a universal healthcare system, free at the point of use, and promised to reduce the cost of GP visits. The manifesto also supported the conservation of Jèrriais.

The party supports environmental activism. On 30 April, 2019, party chairman Mézec addressed a rally of local Extinction Rebellion activists in the Royal Square. On 2 May 2019, during a debate in the States Assembly, Deputy Montfort Tadier called for “ecological socialism” in response to anthropogenic climate change.

Reform Jersey’s “‘New Deal’ for Jersey”, first published on 1 June 2020 and inspired by both the New Deal of Franklin D. Roosevelt and contemporary proposals for a Green New Deal, calls for free access to primary healthcare, extended rent freezes, reduction of the qualifying period for unfair dismissal, and continuing income support and debt write-offs for low-income islanders.

Electoral performance 

 a.Anne Southern received 17.2% of the island-wide vote in the senatorial election.
 b.Sam Mézec received 40.8% of the island-wide vote in the senatorial election.

References

External links

Political parties in Jersey
Political parties established in 2014
2012 establishments in Jersey